The Huarmey Province is one of 20 provinces located in the Ancash Region of Peru. It takes around 4 hours to arrive to Huarmey from Lima by bus and its main economic activities include agriculture, fishing, tourism, and mineral shipping.

Political division
Huarmey is divided into five districts, which are:
 Cochapeti 
 Culebras 
 Huarmey 
 Huayan 
 Malvas

See also
 Kunkush Kancha
 Pillaka
 Ututu Hirka

References

alcalde de Huarmytey sr. Felix Federico Moscoso Vite

External links
 Official web site of the Huarmey Province

Huarmey Province